Pinus morrisonicola (Taiwan white pine), is a species of conifer in the family Pinaceae. The trunk is often crooked. Needles are in bundles of five.

Distribution
Pinus morrisonicola is endemic to Taiwan. It grows at altitudes of  throughout the island. At present, it is scarce at lower elevations and mostly present at higher elevations and less accessible places.

Uses 
Compared with the similar-looking black pine (Pinus thunbergii), Taiwan white pine's needles are slenderer and more delicate. When the new leaves sprout, the green color in different shades is stunningly beautiful. Because of these features, the plant plays an important role in garden landscaping and bonsai production. The quality wood can be used as building materials, furniture and paper making. The leaves can also be juiced as a drink or used as medicine and the fruits can be refined into aromatic essential oils.

Gallery

References

morrisonicola
Endemic flora of Taiwan
Trees of Taiwan
Least concern plants
Taxonomy articles created by Polbot